HMS Racer was a Royal Navy Mariner-class composite screw gunvessel of 8 guns.

Building
Designed by Nathaniel Barnaby, the Royal Navy Director of Naval Construction, her hull was of composite construction; that is, iron keel, frames, stem and stern posts with wooden planking. She was fitted with a 2-cylinder horizontal compound-expansion steam engine driving a single propeller, produced by Hawthorn Leslie. She was rigged with three masts, with square rig on the fore- and main-masts, making her a barque-rigged vessel.

Her keel was laid at Devonport Royal Dockyard on 9 April 1883 and she was launched on 6 August 1884. Her entire class were re-classified in November 1884 as sloops before they entered service.

Career
Racer was commissioned into the Royal Navy on 9 April 1885. She served in Sierra Leone in 1886 and became a tender to the training ship HMS Britannia at Dartmouth, Devon in 1896. She was present at the Fleet Review at Spithead in celebration of the Diamond Jubilee on 26 June 1897.

When Royal Navy officer training moved to Royal Naval College, Osborne, near Cowes, in 1903, Racer became a tender to the new establishment.

In 1916–17 Racer was rebuilt as a salvage vessel, being given the starboard machinery of Torpedo Boat 8, as well as two 17-ton derricks and submersible electric, steam centrifugal and compressed air pumps capable of pumping 3,000 tonnes (3 million litres) of water per hour.

Each summer from 1920 to 1924 Racer was the diving support vessel to recover gold bars from HMS , which had been sunk by German mines at the mouth of Lough Swilly in 1917. Her derricks also raised many hundreds of tons of wreckage and sand from Laurentic that divers removed to reach the gold. Her divers recovered 3,186 of the 3,211 gold bars.

Disposal
Racer was sold for scrap to Hughes Bolckow of Blyth, Northumberland on 6 November 1928.

References
 

 

1884 ships
Mariner-class gunvessels
Ships built in Plymouth, Devon
Victorian-era gunboats of the United Kingdom
World War I sloops of the United Kingdom